The 2016 Archery World Cup is the 11th edition of the international archery circuit organised annually by the World Archery Federation. The preliminary stage consisted of three legs instead of the usual four, to make room for the Olympic archery tournament. The third leg was also the final Olympic qualification event.

Competition rules and scoring
The compound legs consisted of a 50 m qualification round of 72 arrows, followed by the compound round at 50 m on a 6-zone target face, using cumulative scoring for all individual, team and mixed competitions. The top seven individual performers (with no more than two from each country,) plus one host nation representative if not already qualified, proceeded to the finals; the top mixed team performer proceeded to face the host nation at the finals, which were the same competition format as the legs. The team competition was not competed at the finals.

The recurve legs consisted of a 1440 qualification round (formerly called a FITA round), followed by a 72 m Olympic set system. The top seven individual performers (with no more than two from each country), plus one host nation representative if not already qualified, proceeded to the finals; the top mixed team performer proceeded to face the host nation at the finals, which were the same competition format as the legs. The team competition was not competed at the finals.

The scores awarded in the four stages were as follows:

Individual scoring

Mixed team scoring

Calendar

Results

Recurve

Men's individual

Women's individual

Men's team

Women's team

Mixed team

Compound

Men's individual

Women's individual

Men's team

Women's team

Mixed team

Medals table

References

External links

Archery World Cup
World Cup
2016 in Chinese sport
2016 in Turkish sport
2016 in Colombian sport
2016 in Danish sport
International archery competitions hosted by China
International archery competitions hosted by Turkey
International archery competitions hosted by Colombia
International archery competitions hosted by Denmark